The Lonesome Trail is a 1930 American Western film directed by Bruce Mitchell, starring Charles Delaney, Ben Corbett, and Jimmy Aubrey. It premiered in New York City on August 7, 1930.

Cast
 Charles Delaney as Judd Rascomb
 Ben Corbett as Sweetheart
 Jimmy Aubrey as Tenderfoot
 Monte Montague as Gila Red
 Virginia Brown Faire as Martha
 Bill McCall as Rankin
 George Berliner as Crabb
 George Hackathorne as Oswald
 William Von Brincken as Man in white sombrero
 George Regas as The Ring Tailored Roarer
 Lafe McKee as Sheriff
 Yakima Canutt as Two Gun
 Bob Reeves as Alkali
 Art Mix as Slim

References

1930 Western (genre) films
1930 films
American black-and-white films
American Western (genre) films
Films directed by Bruce M. Mitchell
1930s American films
1930s English-language films